Charles Berstad (born 29 November 1964) is a retired Norwegian football player and current coach.

He played for Disenå, Skarnes before playing for Kongsvinger from 1983 to 1992. He then played for Bodø/Glimt from 1993 to 1994, then Kongsvinger again from 1995 to 1998. Berstad has played 303 matches in Tippeligaen, the highest level of football in Norway, and is currently ranked 21st amongst players with the most games played.

He left Kongsvinger and joined Danish club Ikast FS, which in 1999 became FC Midtjylland. He played for Ham-Kam from the summer of 1999 to 2000. He coached Ham-Kam in 2001 before being playing coach of Hamar in 2002. He coached the northern team Fauske/Sprint, then Nybergsund not far from Hamar before signing for another northern team Mo ahead of the 2008 season. He resigned from Mo in July 2009.

Honours
Norwegian Football Cup: Winner 1993

References

1964 births
Living people
People from Hedmark
Norwegian footballers
Eliteserien players
Kongsvinger IL Toppfotball players
FK Bodø/Glimt players
FC Midtjylland players
Norwegian expatriate footballers
Expatriate men's footballers in Denmark
Norwegian expatriate sportspeople in Denmark
Hamarkameratene players
Norwegian football managers
Association football defenders
Sportspeople from Innlandet